Nezpique River  (locally pronounced , translated to "tattooed nose bayou") is a small river located in the Mermentau River basin of south Louisiana, USA.

The area was first settled by the Attakapa Indian tribe. The river was named by French colonists after the Attakapa village along the Bayou Nezpiqué.

Le Tortue (tortoise in French) was chief of the village of Nezpiqué; the transaction was recorded in 1791. In 1932, linguist William A. Read explained that the word Nezpiqué, or "tattooed nose", "simply emphasizes the fact that the Indians in its vicinity practiced the art of tattooing."

The river depth in the Upper Bayou region in Evangeline Parish is about 7–10 feet average, while in the lower river course, it deepens to about 35–40 feet average.

Since the late 20th century, the Nezpique River is controlled by the Upper Bayou Nezpique No 7 Dam, which was completed in 1970 in Evangeline Parish.

Also, the River contains the Crooked Creek Reservoir, which is impounded by the Upper Bayou Nezpique No 3 Dam in Evangeline Parish. It is used for flood control and recreation purposes.

See also
List of rivers in Louisiana

References

Rivers of Louisiana
Dams in Louisiana
Bodies of water of Evangeline Parish, Louisiana